Quincieux is a commune in the Metropolis of Lyon in Auvergne-Rhône-Alpes region in eastern France.

See also
 Communes of the Metropolis of Lyon

References

Communes of Lyon Metropolis
Lyonnais